Justinas Januševskij (born 26 March 1994) is a Lithuanian professional footballer who plays as a defender for the Lithuanian club Banga.

Club career
Januševskij joined FK Trakai at the age of 15, and has spent his entire playing career with them.

On 28 December 2019, he became a member of FK Panevėžys.

International career
Januševskij made his professional debut for the Lithuania national football team in a friendly 1–0 loss to Iran on 8 June 2018.

References

External links
 
 Lietuvos Futbol profile
 FKT Profile
 A Lyga Profile

1994 births
Living people
Lithuanian footballers
Lithuania international footballers
Lithuania youth international footballers
A Lyga players
FK Riteriai players
Association football defenders
Lithuanian people of Russian descent